Karsy may refer to the following places:
Karsy, Lesser Poland Voivodeship (south Poland)
Karsy, Łódź Voivodeship (central Poland)
Karsy, Jędrzejów County in Świętokrzyskie Voivodeship (south-central Poland)
Karsy, Opatów County in Świętokrzyskie Voivodeship (south-central Poland)
Karsy, Masovian Voivodeship (east-central Poland)
Karsy, Konin County in Greater Poland Voivodeship (west-central Poland)
Karsy, Pleszew County in Greater Poland Voivodeship (west-central Poland)

See also

Karey (disambiguation)
Karly